Phibro Animal Health is an American animal health and mineral nutrition company. Its products include antibacterials, anticoccidials, anthelmintics, as well as animal nutrition and vaccines for livestock.
The company operates through three segments Mineral Nutrition, Performance Materials, and Animal Health, from which most of its revenue is derived. The company operates in the United States, Latin America, Canada, Europe, Middle East, Africa, and Asia-Pacific. It is incorporated in Delaware.

History
The company was founded in 1946 as Phillip Brothers Chemicals, Inc.

In 1974, it acquired Koffolk, an animal nutrition company based in Israel.

In 2000, Pfizer sold its medicated feed additives business to Phibro Animal Health

In 2003, the company changed its name from Phillip Brothers Chemicals to Phibro Animal Health.

In 2009, the company acquired Baltzell US mineral nutrition business and ABIC Laboratories, a vaccine maker from Israel.

In 2014, Phibro Animal Health held an initial public offering and became listed on the Nasdaq.

In 2018, the company established a biotech facility in Sligo, Ireland producing animal health vaccines. It became the company's first manufacturing plant in Europe.

References

External links

Veterinary medicine companies
Companies based in Bergen County, New Jersey
Companies established in 1946
Companies listed on the Nasdaq
Teaneck, New Jersey
Veterinary medicine in the United States
Pharmaceutical companies of the United States
Health care companies based in New Jersey